Perisyntrocha suffusa is a moth in the family Crambidae. It is found in Indonesia (Papua).

References

Moths described in 1912
Spilomelinae